Sasha Litvintseva is an artist, filmmaker and author, based in London. She is known for her films Constant, A Demonstration, and Salarium.

Early life and education
Sasha graduated from the Slade School of Fine Art in 2012 and holds a PhD in Media, Communications and Cultural Studies from Goldsmiths, University of London.

Career 
In 2016, She co-directed the documentary Asbestos, along with Graeme Arnfield, which premiered at the Berlin International Film Festival and screened at the Berlinische Galerie and the Smart Museum of Art. In 2017, she co-directed Salarium, along with Daniel Mann, premiered at Cinéma du Réel and screened at the Institute of Contemporary Arts and the Museum of Contemporary Art, Chicago.

In 2020, Sasha co-directed A Demonstration, along with her long-term collaborator Beny Wagner, which premiered at the Berlin International Film Festival and screened at the Museum of the Moving Image and the Vancouver International Film Festival. In 2022, she and Wagner released their second film Constant, which premiered at the International Film Festival Rotterdam and screened at CPH:DOX and the Open City Documentary Festival.  They are currently working on the feature film My Want of You Partakes of Me, a final film in their trilogy.

Filmography

 2022 – Constant
 2020 – A Demonstration
 2020 – Every Rupture
 2019 – Bilateria
 2017 – Salarium
 2016 – Asbestos

 2016 – The Stability of the System
 2015 – Exile Exotic
 2015 – Immortality, Home and Elsewhere
 2014 – Evergreen
 2013 – Alluvion

Publications 
 2021 – All Thoughts Fly: Monster, Taxonomy, Film (co-written with Beny Wagner)
 2022 – Geological Filmmaking

Awards and nominations

References

External links
 
 

Living people
Russian documentary filmmakers
Russian writers
Russian artists
English documentary filmmakers
Film directors from London
1989 births
Slade School of Fine Art